Arany-Album is the sixth studio album of the Hungarian folk metal band Dalriada. The tracks are musicalized versions of popular works by János Arany. It won the 2009 HangSúly Hungarian Metal Awards out of 70 contestants and peaked at position 4 in the Hungarian Mahasz official charts.

Track listing
 "Zách Klára"
 "János pap országa"
 "Bor vitéz"
 "Ágnes asszony 1"
 "Ágnes asszony 2"
 "Szent László 1"
 "Szent László 2"
 "A walesi bárdok 1"
 "A walesi bárdok 2"
 "A walesi bárdok 3"
 "A rab gólya "
 "Szondi két apródja 1"
 "Szondi két apródja 2"

Personnel 
 Laura Binder – vocals, violin
 András Ficzek – vocals, guitars
 István Molnár – bass
 Barnabás Ungár –- keyboards
 Mátyás Németh-Szabó – guitar
 Tadeusz Rieckmann – drums

Sources

 Arany-album is out now - Zenemagazin.com
 Dalriada: Arany-album - Zene.hu
 Dalriada: Arany-album - Fémforgács.hu

External links
 Dalriada official website
 Dalriada on Myspace

2009 albums
Dalriada (band) albums